William Cliff (born 17 October 1988) is a rugby union player for Sale Sharks. He plays as a scrum half.

He scored his first try for Sale in their 49–24 win over CA Brive in the European Challenge Cup quarter-final in 2008.

He played for Glasgow Warriors in 2010 with a view to getting a loan deal with the club but registration problems meant that the deal fell through and Cliff returned to Sale Sharks.
Cliff signed for Bristol for the 2015-16 Greene King IPA Championship season, winning promotion to the Premiership in his first season in the south west.

External links
Sale profile

References

1988 births
Living people
Rugby union scrum-halves
English rugby union players
Sale Sharks players
Glasgow Warriors players
Bristol Bears players
Leeds Tykes players
Rugby union players from Macclesfield